Kevin Connor may refer to:

Kevin Connor (director) (born 1937), English film and television director
Kevin Connor (artist) (born 1932), Australian artist

See also
Kevin Connors, sports reporter and news anchor
 Kevin Joseph Connors, real name of Chuck Connors (1921–1992), American actor, writer and basketball and baseball player